Al-Qaeda in the Islamic Maghreb, or AQIM, is an Islamist militant organization (of al-Qaeda) that aims to overthrow the Algerian government and institute an Islamic state. To that end, it is currently engaged in an insurgency campaign in the Maghreb and Sahel regions.

The group originated as the Salafist Group for Preaching and Combat (GSPC). It has since declared its intention to attack European (including Spanish and French) and American targets. The group has been designated a terrorist organization by the United Nations, Australia, Canada, Malaysia, Russia, the United Arab Emirates, the United Kingdom and the United States.

Membership is mostly drawn from the Algerian and local Saharan communities (such as the Tuaregs and Berabiche tribal clans of Mali), as well as Moroccans from city suburbs of the North African country. The group has also been suspected of having links with the Horn of Africa-based militant group Al-Shabaab. AQIM has focused on kidnapping for ransom as a means of raising funds and is estimated to have raised more than $50 million in the last decade.

On 2 March 2017, the Sahara branch of AQIM merged with Macina Liberation Front, Ansar Dine and Al-Mourabitoun into Jama'at Nasr al-Islam wal Muslimin.

Name
The group's official name is Organization of al-Qa'ida in the Land of the Islamic Maghreb (Qaedat al-Jihad fi Bilad al-Maghrib al-Islami), often shortened to Al-Qaeda in the Islamic Maghreb (AQIM, from French al-Qaïda au Maghreb islamique, AQMI). Prior to January 2007 it was known as the Salafist Group for Preaching and Combat and the French acronym GSPC.

History

In January 2007, the GSPC announced that it would now operate under the name of Al-Qaeda in the Islamic Maghreb (AQIM).

On 19 January 2009, the UK newspaper The Sun reported that there had been an outbreak of bubonic plague at an AQIM training camp in the Tizi Ouzou province in Algeria. The Washington Times, in an article based on a senior U.S. intelligence official source, claimed a day later that the incident was not related to bubonic plague, but was an accident involving either a biological or chemical agent.

Al Qaeda in the Islamic Maghreb is one of the region's wealthiest, best-armed militant groups due to the payment of ransom demands by humanitarian organizations and Western governments. It is reported that 90 per cent of AQIM resources come from ransoms paid in return for the release of hostages.  Omar Ould Hamaha said:

In December 2012, one of AQIM's top commanders, Mokhtar Belmokhtar, split off from AQIM and took his fighters with him, executing the In Amenas hostage crisis in Algeria weeks later, just after France launched Operation Serval in Mali. Belmokhtar later claimed he acted on behalf of Al Qaeda. In December 2015, Belmokhtar's splinter group, Al-Mourabitoun rejoined AQIM, according to audio statements released by both groups.

A top commander of AQIM, Abdelhamid Abou Zeid, was reported killed by French and Chadian forces in northern Mali on 25 February 2013. This was confirmed by AQIM in June 2013.

Alleged prejudice

The United States National Counterterrorism Center stated that AQIM had a reputation for holding cultural and racial insensitivities towards Sub-Saharan Africans. The NCTC maintained that some recruits "claimed that AQIM was clearly racist against some black members from West Africa because they were only sent against lower-level targets." The bulletin goes on to say that former AQIM commander Mokhtar Belmokhtar in August 2009 stated "he wanted to attract black African recruits because they would agree more readily than Arabs to becoming suicide bombers and because poor economic and social conditions made them ripe for recruitment."

By 2016, AQIM had reportedly recruited large numbers of young sub-Saharan Africans, with attacks like the 2016 Grand-Bassam shootings in Ivory Coast being carried out by black AQIM members. AQIM commander Yahya Abou el-Hammam, in an interview with a Mauritanian website, was quoted as saying "Today, the mujahideen have built up brigades and battalions with sons of the region, our black brothers, Peuls, Bambaras and Songhai".

Leadership
Key leaders and operatives of this group included Yahya Abu el Hammam, who served as a senior leader of al-Qaeda in the Islamic Maghreb (AQIM), planning operations and kidnapping Westerners in North and West Africa.  He was wanted by the US Rewards for Justice Program with a $5 million bounty for his arrest. Hammam played a key role in perpetuating AQIM's terrorist activities in West Africa and Mali, and participated in several AQIM terrorist attacks in Mauritania. In December 2013 Yahya Abu Hammam gave an interview to Aljazeera in which he threatened France's military intervention in the Sahara would open "the gates of hell for the French people". In July 2010, Hammam was reportedly involved in the killing of a seventy-eight year old French hostage in Niger. In 2006, Hammam was sentenced to death in absentia by Algerian authorities for terrorism-related charges. Hammam was killed by French forces in February 2019.

International links

Allegations of the former GSPCs links to al-Qaeda predated the September 11 attacks. As followers of a Qutbist strand of Salafist jihadism, the members of the GSPC were thought to share al-Qaeda's general ideological outlook. After the deposition of Hassan Hattab, various leaders of the group pledged allegiance to al-Qaeda.

In November 2007, Nigerian authorities arrested five men for alleged possession of seven sticks of dynamite and other explosives. Nigerian prosecutors alleged that three of the accused had trained for two years with the then Salafist Group for Preaching and Combat in Algeria. In January 2008 the Dakar Rally was cancelled due to threats made by associated terrorist organizations.

In late 2011, the splinter group Movement for Oneness and Jihad in West Africa was founded in order to spread jihadi activities further into West Africa. Their military leader is Omar Ould Hamaha, a former AQIM fighter.

According to U.S. Army General Carter Ham, Al-Qaeda in the Islamic Maghreb, the Somalia-based Al-Shabaab, and the Nigeria-based Boko Haram were as of June 2012 attempting to synchronize and coordinate their activities in terms of sharing funds, training and explosives. Ham added that he believed that the collaboration presented a threat to both U.S. homeland security and the local authorities. However, according to counter-terrorism specialist Rick Nelson with the Washington-based Center for Strategic International Studies, there was little evidence that the three groups were targeting U.S. areas, as each was primarily interested in establishing fundamentalist administrations in their respective regions.

In a 2013, Al Jazeera interview in Timbuktu, AQIM commander Talha claimed that his movement went to Niger, Algeria, Burkina Faso and Nigeria, to organize cells of AQIM. He explained their strategy: "There are many people who have nothing, and you can reach them by the word of God, or by helping them."

Statements

Al Qaeda in the Islamic Maghreb operates a media outlet known as al-Andalus, which regularly releases propaganda videos showing AQIM operations, hostages, and statements from members.

According to London-based risk analysis firm Stirling Assynt, AQIM issued a call for vengeance against Beijing for mistreatment of its Muslim minority following the July 2009 Ürümqi riots.

AQIM voiced support for demonstrations against the Tunisian and Algerian Governments in a video released on 13 January 2011. Al Qaeda offered military aid and training to the demonstrators, calling on them to overthrow "the corrupt, criminal and tyrannical" regime, calling for "retaliation" against the Tunisian government, and also calling for the overthrow of Algerian president Abdelaziz Bouteflika. AQIM leader Abu Musab Abdul Wadud appeared in the video, calling for Islamic sharia law to be established in Tunisia. Al Qaeda has begun recruiting anti-government demonstrators, some of whom have previously fought against American forces in Iraq and Israeli forces in Gaza.

AQIM endorsed efforts in Libya to topple the regime of Colonel Muammar Gaddafi, though it remains unclear how many fighters in Libya are loyal to al-Qaeda. Gaddafi seized on the expression of support and help for the rebel movement to blame al-Qaeda for fomenting the uprising.

Timeline of attacks

2007–09
 11 April 2007: Two car bombs were detonated by the group. One was close to the Prime Minister's office in Algiers and the blast killed more than 30 people and wounded more than 150.
 February 2008: Two Austrians were captured in Tunisia and taken via Algeria to Mali and freed later that year, the kidnappings were attributed to Al-Qaeda in the Islamic Maghreb
 December 2008: Two Canadian diplomats were taken hostage along with their driver in south-western Niger while on official UN mission to resolve a crisis in northern Niger. The driver was freed in March 2009. The diplomats were freed in April 2009. The kidnappings were attributed to Al-Qaeda in the Islamic Maghreb.
 22 January 2009: Four Westerners were kidnapped while visiting the Andéramboukane festival in Niger near the border with Mali. AQIM demanded the British government release Abu Qatada, and on 31 May 2009 a statement was released claiming Edwyn Dyer had been executed, which was confirmed by the British Prime Minister Gordon Brown on 3 June 2009. All of the other tourists were eventually released.
 30 July 2009: At least 11 Algerian soldiers are killed in an ambush while escorting a military convoy outside the coastal town of Damous, near Tipaza.

2010–12
 March 2010: an Italian national, Sergio Cicala, and his wife are held hostage. They were released on 16 April 2010.
 21 March 2010: Three militants are killed by security forces near El Ma Labiod,  from Tebessa.
 26 March 2010: Three militants are killed and another captured by security forces in Ait Yahia Moussa,  from Tizi Ouzou.
 14 April 2010: According to Algerian officials, at least ten militants are killed during a counter-terrorist operation in Bordj Bou Arreridj wilaya.
 16 September 2010: seven employees from Areva and Vinci are kidnapped in Arlit, Niger (five French, one Togolese and one Malagasy). The capture was claimed on 21 September by AQIM in a communiqué published in Al Jazeera. Three of the hostages were released on 24 February 2011. The other four were released on 28 October 2013.
 25 November 2011: Three Western tourists were abducted in Timbuktu: Sjaak Rijke from the Netherlands, Johan Gustafsson from Sweden and Stephen Malcolm McGown from South Africa. A fourth tourist, from Germany, was killed when he refused to cooperate with the perpetrators. Rijke was rescued in April 2015. Gustafsson was released in June 2017. McGown was released in July 2017.
 9 December 2011: AQIM published two photos, showing five kidnapped persons of European descent including the three tourists abducted in Timbuktu. French hostage Philippe Verdon was killed in March 2013. His body was found in July 2013. French hostage Serge Lazarevic was released on 9 December. 2013.

2013–2015
 30 September 2013: AQIM claimed responsibility for a suicide car bombing in Timbuktu that killed at least two civilians.
 20 November 2015: AQIM and Al-Mourabitoun attacked a hotel in Bamako, Mali. They took more than 100 persons hostage, killing 19 before the siege was ended by security forces.

2016–2018
 8 January 2016: Gunmen kidnapped Swiss nun Beatrice Stockly in Timbuctoo, Mali. AQIM claimed responsibility for the kidnapping a month later, and released a video in January 2017 showing Stockly still alive. Stockly was killed in September 2020.
 15 January 2016: AQIM gunmen attack the Capuccino and Splendid Hotel in Ouagadougou, killing at least 28 people, wounding at least 56 and taking a total of 126 hostages. 200 km to the north, Australian couple Ken and Jocelyn Elliott, medical doctors, were kidnapped. Jocelyn was released a few days later due to guidance from al Qaeda leaders, as mentioned in a recording released by AQIM (in which AQIM takes responsibility for the kidnapping).
13 March 2016: AQIM attacked the town of Grand-Bassam, in the Ivory Coast, killing at least 16 people, including 2 soldiers, and 4 European tourists. 6 assailants were also killed.
 1 July 2018: A suicide bomber drove a vehicle loaded with explosives into an army patrol and detonated it in the Malian city of Gao. Four civilians were killed and 31 others, including four French soldiers, wounded in the attack, AQIM claimed responsibility for the attack.
 8 July 2018: The Uqba bin Nafi Battalion, the Tunisian wing of AQIM, claimed responsibility for an attack which killed six Tunisian policemen in Ghardimaou, Jendouba Governorate.

2019–present
 20 January 2019: AQIM claims the attack on 10 UN Mali peacekeepers due to Chad's restoration of relations with Israel.
 26 April 2019: a Tunisian Army soldier was killed and three were injured in an IED attack in Chaambi Mountains National Park, north-western Tunisia. AQIM claimed the attack was undertaken by militants from its Uqba bin Nafi Battalion.
 On 20 June 2020, militants ambushed an Algerian Army detachment in Ain Defla, northern Algeria, killing one soldier. An al-Qa’ida-aligned media agency claimed that AQIM was responsible for the attack.
On 27 June 2020, two Algerian Army personnel were killed by an improvised explosive device (IED) in Ain Dalia, northern Algeria. An al-Qa’ida-aligned media agency claimed that AQIM was responsible for the attack.
On 25 to 26 February 2022, France anti-jihadist military forces conducted an operation in Mali which resulted in the death of Yahia Djouadi, AQIM's leader for financing and logistics and former "emir" of the group's Libyan operations.

See also

 Infiltration of terrorist groups
 Insurgency in the Maghreb (2002–present)
 Jund al-Khilafah

References

Further reading

External links

 Al-Qaeda in the Islamic Maghreb (aka Salafist Group for Preaching and Combat)  The Council on Foreign Relations
 Al-Qaeda in the Islamic Maghreb (AQIM), Counter Extremism Project
 Is Salafism an Indicator of Terrorism, Political Violence and Radicalization?
 The ISIS Correspondent, interview with Rukmini Callimachi | Slate.com |JULY 12 2016

 
Anti-communist organizations
Anti-Western sentiment
Factions of the Algerian Civil War
Islamic terrorism in France
Islamism in Africa
Jihadist groups in Algeria
Jihadist groups in Libya
Organisations based in Tunisia
Organisations designated as terrorist by Australia
Organizations based in Africa designated as terrorist
Rebel groups in Mali
Rebel groups in Niger
Terrorism in Algeria
Terrorism in Morocco
Terrorism in Tunisia
Qutbist organisations
Organisations designated as terrorist by the United Kingdom
Organizations designated as terrorist by the United States
War on terror
Organizations designated as terrorist by the United Arab Emirates
2007 establishments in Africa
Islamic organizations established in 2007
Organizations designated as terrorist by Canada
Organizations designated as terrorist by Malaysia